This is a list of FM radio stations in the United States having call signs beginning with the letters KK through KM. Low-power FM radio stations, those with designations such as KKAS-LP, have not been included in this list.

KK--

KL--

KM--

See also
 North American call sign

FM radio stations in the United States by call sign (initial letters KK-KM)